"Bobo" is a song by Aya Nakamura, released on 27 May 2021. It reached the top three in France and top 20 in Switzerland.

Charts

Weekly charts

Year-end charts

Certifications

References

2021 songs
2021 singles
Aya Nakamura songs
Songs written by Aya Nakamura